Scottish Highlander may refer to:

The people and culture of the Scottish Highlands
Scottish Highlander (barge)  a boutique hotel barge cruising the Caledonian Canal in Scotland